Sthandwa Nzuza (born 9 February 1984), is a South African actress and radio DJ artist. She is best known for the roles in the television serials such as; Imbeleko, Uzalo and Ifalakhe and Durban Gen

Personal life
Nzuza was born on 9 February 1984 in Inanda township in the KwaZulu-Natal, South Africa. She completed her high school education in 2002 from Cambridge College.

She is married to Philani Gama, a Durban pastor since 2017. In 2020, she filed a case against the husband allegedly laid charges of assault against him.

Career
In 2014, she appeared as a featured guest in the SABC1 music talk show Zaziwa. In 2017 she starred in the Mzansi Magic telefilm Imbeleko. In 2019, she appeared in the two television serials: Friendship, and Mzansi Magic drama series eHostela with recurring roles. In 2017, she made the recurring role of "Innocentia" on the SABC1 soap opera Uzalo. The role became very popular and she continued to play the role in both third and fourth seasons. After that success, Sthandwa made her first television lead role as "Nomvula" in the Mzansi Magic drama serial Ifalakhe in 2019.

Other than these leading roles, she also made guest starring role in the television series and sitcoms such as; Mtunzini.com, My Perfect Family and Single Galz. In 2020, she joined with the serial Durban Gen with the role "Dr Zandile Mkhize".

Apart from acting, she is also a DJ working for the radio station "Ukhozi FM".

Filmography

References

External links
 IMDb

Living people
South African film actresses
South African television actresses
1984 births